Dato' Ngeh Koo Ham (Bàng-uâ-cê: Ngà̤ Kō̤-háng; born 29 September 1961), also known as James Ngeh, is a Malaysian politician and lawyer who has served as the Member of Parliament (MP) for Beruas since March 2008. He served as Speaker of the Perak State Legislative Assembly from July 2018 to May 2020 and Member of the assembly (MLA) for Sitiawan from March 2004 to May 2018, Member of the Perak State Executive Council (EXCO) in the Pakatan Rakyat (PR) administration under former Menteri Besar Mohammad Nizar Jamaluddin from March 2008 to the collapse of the PR administration in February 2009. He is a member of the Democratic Action Party (DAP), a component party of presently the Pakatan Harapan (PH) and formerly PR opposition coalitions. He was also Deputy Secretary-General of DAP, member of the Central Executive Committee (CEC) of DAP and State Chairman of DAP of Perak.

Personal life

A native of Ayer Tawar, Perak, Ngeh comes from an old Ayer Tawar Methodist family. Ngeh's parents were rubber tappers in Ayer Tawar. He was christened James by the late Rev. Koh Gie Bing. As a student, he was active in the Methodist Youth Fellowship and later with the Persatuan Kristian Varsiti (PKV, part of the International Fellowship of Evangelical Students) at Universiti Malaya where he obtained a Bachelor of Laws. He has also served on the Local Church Executive Council (LCEC) of the Ayer Tawar Chinese Methodist Church (ATCMC) and provided legal counsel to the Methodist Church in Malaysia. He is a regular communicant member of ATCMC where he often also provides translation during Sunday worship.

He married Cheok Foong Ling from Setiawan in 1992. They have three children.

Education
Ngeh attended the Methodist English School, Ayer Tawar; Sekolah Menengah Jenis Kebangsaan (SMJK) Shyr Tien, Ayer Tawar; and the (Methodist) Anglo-Chinese School, Setiawan.  He went on to graduate from Universiti Malaya as a Bachelor of Laws.

Professional career
Ngeh practised as a lawyer with Nga Hock Cheh and Co. (no relation) in Sitiawan before starting his own law firm, Ngeh and Co, which is headquartered in Ayer Tawar, with branches in Ipoh, Perak and Kuala Lumpur.

In one of his more famous cases during his legal career, Ngeh Koo Ham represented Sitiawan businessman Yong Kon Fatt, who was sued by Indah Water Konsortium Sdn Bhd (IWK) in January 2005 for refusing to pay RM1,074 for sewerage services purportedly provided to his house at Taman Samudera in Lumut. The High Court sitting in Ipoh ruled that 'those who have made payments to IWK but had not received any sewerage services could demand refunds'.

Political career
Ngeh first stood in the 1990 general election against Lim Keng Yaik for the parliamentary seat of Beruas. He nevertheless lost to Lim, president of Parti Gerakan Rakyat Malaysia (Gerakan) and a powerful Barisan Nasional (BN) cabinet minister, by a narrow margin. In the 1995 general election, he contested but lost in the Batu Gajah seat. In the 1999 general election, he contested but lost in both the Ipoh Timor parliamentary seat and Pasir Pinji state seat in Perak.

Ngeh begun to be a state assemblyman for Sitiawan, Perak for three terms continuously following his victories in the 2004, 2008 and 2013 general elections. He also served as the head of the Opposition in the Perak State Legislative Assembly from 2004 to 2008. After 2008 election, with the formation of the Perak new state government by the Pakatan Rakyat (PR) coalition of DAP, People's Justice Party (PKR) and Pan-Malaysian Islamic Party (PAS); which was faced with the problem of the candidate of new Chief Minister. Among the 3 parties, DAP has the most seats, but the Perak state constitution says that the Chief Minister must be a Malay Muslim. Ngeh, being the Chairman of the Perak DAP, is ethnic Chinese and a Christian. They initially agreed that Mohammad Nizar Jamaluddin from PAS should be the Chief Minister but in the end try persuading the Sultan, Sultan Azlan Shah, to appoint Ngeh as the non-Malay, non-Muslim Chief Minister. They listed three candidates, the other two being Mohammad Nizar Jamaluddin and Mohd Radzi from PKR. Finally the Sultan rejected Ngeh and wanted to appoint a Malay who is a professional. All of the Malay state assemblymen in PKR have only Form 5 (Secondary school year 5) qualification. Thus Mohammad Nizar, being an engineer and carrying the highest position in PAS among the Perak PAS state assemblymen, became the new Chief Minister. Ngeh was appointed to the state executive committee as senior state executive councillor, with the portfolios of Infrastructure and Public Amenities; Energy and Water; and Non-Muslim Affairs during the short-lived state government was led by PR from March 2008 to May 2009, which the PR state government had collapsed due to the 2009 Perak political crisis.

In the 2008 and 2013 general elections, Ngeh also contested and won the Beruas parliamentary seat to become the Beruas MP and Sitiawan state assemblyman concurrently. In the 2018 general election (GE14), Ngeh contested just the parliamentary seat and did not contest his state seat which was abolished. After GE14 which saw the Pakatan Harapan (PH) taking over the federal and Perak state governments, Ngeh was appointed the Speaker of the Perak State Legislative Assembly on 3 July 2018 despite not being an assemblyman. He is the first speaker of Chinese descent. Ngeh resigns as the Perak Speaker on 12 May 2020 after the collapse of the Pakatan Harapan (PH)'s state and federal governments in the 2020 political crisis.

Controversies and issues

Anti-Islam remarks
In 2012, Ngeh drew flak with remarks over the "Innocence of Muslims" film which insulted Muhammad and Islam. Ngeh had allegedly tweeted: "Khairy wants Muslim protest against Sam Bacile. For Islam or for his political gains? Are Muslims wasting too much time and energy on this?" Ngeh apologised after it received widespread criticisms from Muslims and had the post removed.

Acceptance of Perak state Datukship award and title
In April 2008, Sultan Azlan Shah of Perak in conjunction with his 80th birthday, had bestowed Ngeh the Darjah Dato Paduka Mahkota Perak (DPMP) award which carries the title Dato'. He is the first actively serving DAP politician to be conferred (and accepted) a Malaysian chivalrous title. Later in 2012, DAP chairman Karpal Singh had rebuked Ngeh and Teng Chang Khim on their acceptance "Datukship" awards of Perak in 2008 and Selangor in 2010 respectively; which had breached the party's long-standing principal agreed upon since the mid-1990s on DAP elected representatives receiving awards during their active political service. Ngeh had claimed that the party's CEC had discussed and consented to the award that was conferred upon him.

Election results

Honour and award
  :
  Knight Commander of the Order of the Perak State Crown (DPMP) – Dato' (2008)

References

External links 
 http://ngehkooham.blogspot.com – official website
 Democratic Action Party
 Perak state government

1961 births
Living people
People from Perak
Malaysian politicians of Chinese descent
Malaysian Methodists
20th-century Malaysian lawyers
Democratic Action Party (Malaysia) politicians
Members of the Dewan Rakyat
Members of the Perak State Legislative Assembly
Perak state executive councillors
Leaders of the Opposition in the Perak State Legislative Assembly
Speakers of the Perak State Legislative Assembly
University of Malaya alumni
21st-century Malaysian politicians